Alessandro Mastalli (born 7 February 1996) is an Italian footballer who plays as a midfielder for  club Lucchese.

Club career 
Mastalli is a youth exponent from Milan. He made his Serie A debut at 24 May 2015 against Torino F.C. He replaced Andrea Poli after 76 minutes in a 3–0 home win.

At the start of the 2015–16 season, he moved to Swiss club Lugano on a one-year loan deal, but he moved back to Milan in January 2016.

On 14 July 2021, he signed a two-year contract with Avellino.

On 16 August 2022, Mastalli joined Lucchese.

References 

1996 births
Living people
Footballers from Bologna
Italian footballers
Association football midfielders
Serie A players
Serie B players
Serie C players
Swiss Super League players
A.C. Milan players
FC Lugano players
S.S. Juve Stabia players
U.S. Avellino 1912 players
Lucchese 1905 players
Italian expatriate footballers
Italian expatriate sportspeople in Switzerland
Expatriate footballers in Switzerland
Italy youth international footballers